Elephantiasis is the enlargement and hardening of limbs or body parts due to tissue swelling. It is characterised by edema, hypertrophy, and fibrosis of skin and subcutaneous tissues, due to obstruction of lymphatic vessels. It may affect the genitalia. The term elephantiasis is often used in reference to (symptoms caused by) parasitic worm infections, but may refer to a variety of diseases where parts of a person's body swell to massive proportions.


Cause
Some conditions that present with elephantiasis include:
 Elephantiasis nostras, due to longstanding chronic lymphangitis
 Elephantiasis tropica (known as lymphatic filariasis), caused by a number of parasitic worms, particularly Wuchereria bancrofti. More than 120 million people, mostly in Africa and Southeast Asia, are affected.
 Nonfilarial elephantiasis (or podoconiosis), an immune disease affecting the lymph vessels
 Leishmaniasis
 Elephantiasis, Grade 3 lymphedema which may occur in people with breast cancer
 Genital elephantiasis, result of lymphogranuloma venereum
 Proteus syndrome, a genetic disorder best known as the condition possibly experienced by Joseph Merrick, the so-called "Elephant Man."

Other causes may include:
 Repeated streptococcal infection
 Lymphadenectomy
 Hereditary birth defects
 Pretibial myxedema

References

External links 

 

Symptoms and signs: Skin and subcutaneous tissue
Diseases of veins, lymphatic vessels and lymph nodes